The 2010 Epping Forest District Council election took place on 6 May 2010 to elect members of Epping Forest District Council in England. This was on the same day as other 2010 United Kingdom general election.

Ward Results 

Figures are compared to the last time these seats were contested in any election cycle for the Epping Forest District Council election, this is indicated.

Buckhurst Hill East

Buckhurst Hill West

Chigwell Village

Chipping Ongar, Greensted and Marden Ash

Epping Hemnall

Epping Lindsey and Thornwood Common

Grange Hill

Loughton Alderton

Loughton Broadway

Loughton Fairmead

Loughton Forest

Loughton Roding

Loughton St. John's

Loughton St. Mary's

Lower Nazeing

North Weald Bassett

Theydon Bois

Waltham Abbey Honey Lane

Waltham Abbey Paternoster

References

2010 English local elections
May 2010 events in the United Kingdom
2010
2010s in Essex